Sivapanthera is a prehistoric genus of felid described by Kretzoi in 1929. Species of  Sivapanthera are closely related to the modern cheetah but differ from modern cheetahs by having relatively longer brain cases, flatter foreheads, narrower nostrils and larger teeth. In many ways, skulls of Sivapanthera show similarity to that of the puma, or even those of Panthera. Scholars differ on the validity of this genus, while some think that it should be treated as a distinct genus, others think that its members should be treated as members of the Acinonyx genus, or even as subspecies of Acinonyx pardinensis.

Two species were assigned to the genus in 2004:
Sivapanthera padhriensis from the Tertiary deposits in Pakistan's Sivalik Hills.
 Sivapanthera linxiaensis from Early Pleistocene deposits in China's Dongxiang Autonomous County.

References

Pleistocene carnivorans
Felines
Fossil taxa described in 1929
Prehistoric mammals of Europe
Prehistoric mammals of Asia
Prehistoric felines
Prehistoric carnivoran genera